Boletus purpureus, commonly known as the purple boletus, is a species of bolete fungus in the family Boletaceae. Found in Europe, where it grows in mixed woods,  it was originally described by Christian Hendrik Persoon in 1825. The fruit bodies are poisonous if they are eaten raw.

See also
 List of Boletus species

References

External links

purpureus
Fungi described in 1825
Fungi of Europe
Taxa named by Christiaan Hendrik Persoon